Glutathione peroxidase 2 is an enzyme that in humans is encoded by the GPX2 gene.

This gene is a member of the glutathione peroxidase family encoding a selenium-dependent glutathione peroxidase that is one of two isoenzymes responsible for the majority of the glutathione-dependent hydrogen peroxide-reducing activity in the epithelium of the gastrointestinal tract. Studies in knockout mice indicate that mRNA expression levels respond to luminal microflora, suggesting a role of the ileal glutathione peroxidases in preventing inflammation in the GI tract.

The antioxidant enzyme glutathione peroxidase 2 (Gpx2) is one out of eight known glutathione peroxidases (Gpx1-8) in humans. Mammalian Gpx1, GPx2 (this protein), Gpx3, and Gpx4 have been shown to be selenium-containing enzymes, whereas Gpx6 is a selenoprotein in humans with cysteine-containing homologues in rodents. In selenoproteins, the 21st amino acid selenocysteine is inserted in the nascent polypeptide chain during the process of translational recoding of the UGA stop codon.

References

Further reading

EC 1.11.1
Selenoproteins